Bob Hager (born 24 May 1961 in Waukon, Iowa) is a former Republican party member of the Iowa House of Representatives, representing District 16 from 2011 to 2013. Hager was first elected to the state house in 2010.

During his legislative session, Hager served on the following committees:
 Economic Growth/Rebuild Iowa
 Environmental Protection, Vice Chair
 Local Government
 Natural Resources
 Subcommittee on Economic Development (Joint Appropriations)
Hager is a Roman Catholic and a small business owner. Together with his wife, Kristi, he owns and operates Upper Iowa Resort & Rental, a resort and camping operation near Dorchester, IA. They also run Living Stone, a Waukon-area nonprofit re-entry home for ex-cons, the homeless and other persons in need.

Aside from managing his businesses, Hager has sat on the Allamakee Community School District Board of Education since 2004.

References

Sources
Iowa Republicans bio of Hager
Iowa legislature bio of Hager

1961 births
Republican Party members of the Iowa House of Representatives
Living people
Place of birth missing (living people)
American Roman Catholics